The following articles contain lists of New Testament manuscripts:

In Coptic 

 List of Coptic New Testament manuscripts

In Greek 

 List of New Testament papyri
 List of New Testament uncials
 List of New Testament minuscules
 List of New Testament minuscules (1–1000)
 List of New Testament minuscules (1001–2000)
 List of New Testament minuscules (2001–)
 List of New Testament lectionaries

In Latin 

 Vetus Latina manuscripts § New Testament
 Vulgate manuscripts § New Testament

In Syriac 

 List of Syriac New Testament manuscripts

See also
 Biblical manuscript
 List of Hebrew Bible manuscripts
 Septuagint manuscripts
 Bible translations
 Bible translations into Geʽez
 List of Bible translations by language
 Categories of New Testament manuscripts
 Novum Testamentum Graece